Izsák is a town in Bács-Kiskun county, Hungary.

Famous residents
 Béla Kiss (28 July 1877 – 5 February 1915), Hungarian serial killer

Twin towns – sister cities

Izsák is twinned with:
 Strullendorf, Germany

References

External links 

  in Hungarian

Populated places in Bács-Kiskun County
Towns in Hungary